"My White Bicycle" is a song written by Keith West and Ken Burgess. It was Tomorrow's debut single.

Background
According to Tomorrow drummer John 'Twink' Alder, the song was inspired by the Dutch Provos, an anarchist group in Amsterdam which instituted a bicycle-sharing system: "They had white bicycles in Amsterdam and they used to leave them around the town. And if you were going somewhere and you needed to use a bike, you'd just take the bike and you'd go somewhere and just leave it. Whoever needed the bikes would take them and leave them when they were done."

The group recorded ”My White Bicycle” in Abbey Road studio 1, at the same time as The Beatles were recording Sgt. Pepper's Lonely Hearts Club Band in studio 2, and John Lennon entered the studio while Tomorrow were recording. Later, Lennon wrote in the British international music magazine Melody Maker that he considered the song to be the "psychedelic anthem", and the song subsequently became an underground hit.

Influence
Richie Unterberger of AllMusic wrote that the song was one of the first to prominently feature backward guitar phasing.

Cover versions
The Scottish rock band Nazareth did a cover version, which reached No. 14 in the UK Singles Chart in 1975, staying for eight weeks. 
Actor Nigel Planer, as his character Neil the Hippy from TV-series The Young Ones, reached No. 97 with his cover in 1984.

References

1967 debut singles
1975 singles
1967 songs
Nazareth (band) songs
Parlophone singles
Songs about bicycles
A&M Records singles
Mooncrest Records singles